The 2016 Shenzhen Open (known as 2016 Shenzhen Gemdale Open for sponsorship reason) was a tennis tournament played on outdoor hard courts. It was the fourth edition of the Shenzhen Open, and part of the WTA International tournaments of the 2016 WTA Tour. It took place at the Shenzhen Longgang Sports Center in Shenzhen, China, from 2 to 9 January 2016.

Points and prize money

Point distribution

Prize money

1 Qualifiers prize money is also the Round of 32 prize money
* per team

Singles main draw entrants

Seeds

1 Rankings as of December 28, 2015.

Other entrants
The following players received wildcards into the singles main draw:
  Duan Yingying
  Irina Khromacheva
  Zhang Shuai

The following players received entry from the qualifying draw:
  Nicole Gibbs
  Yaroslava Shvedova
  Tereza Smitková
  Zhang Kailin

The following player received entry using a protected ranking:
  Vania King

The following player received entry as lucky loser:
  Stefanie Vögele

Withdrawals
Before the tournament 
  Olga Govortsova  → replaced by  Kateřina Siniaková
  Magda Linette (gastrointestinal illness)  → replaced by  Stefanie Vögele
  Urszula Radwańska  → replaced by  Donna Vekić

Retirements
  Irina-Camelia Begu (right knee injury)
  Petra Kvitová (gastrointestinal illness)

Doubles main draw entrants

Seeds

1 Rankings as of December 28, 2015

Other entrants 
The following pair received wildcards into the doubles main draw:
  Li Yixuan /  Sheng Yuqi

Withdrawals 
Before the tournament
  Magda Linette (gastrointestinal illness)

Champions

Singles

  Agnieszka Radwańska defeated  Alison Riske, 6–3, 6–2

Doubles

  Vania King /  Monica Niculescu defeated  Xu Yifan /  Zheng Saisai, 6–1, 6–4

References

External links
Official website 

WTA Shenzhen Open
WTA Shenzhen Open
2016